Lokmat is a Marathi language newspaper published in Maharashtra state. Founded in 1971 by Jawaharlal Darda, it is the largest read regional language newspaper in India with more than 18 million readers and the No. 1 Marathi newspaper in Maharashtra & Goa states. It is also available in E-Paper format. Primarily published in Marathi, it is also available in Hindi and English. The Hindi language version of the newspaper name published as Lokmat Samachar and the English version is named Lokmat Times.

Broadcast news channel
Lokmat extended its media business to television through a 50-50 joint venture with IBN18 Broadcast Limited. The joint venture company, IBN-Lokmat Private Limited (“IBNL”), operates IBN-Lokmat, a 24 x 7 Marathi news and current affairs television channel which went on air on April 6, 2008.

Controversies

2015 ISIS cartoon controversy
In 2015, a cartoon published alongside the article "ISIS cha Paisa" (ISIS' money), regarding the funding pattern of terrorist group ISIS, led to violent protests from Muslim groups and attacks on the newspaper's offices in Jalgaon, Dhule, Nandurbar, Malegaon and other locations across Maharashtra. Protestors deemed the cartoon to be "blasphemous". Several complaints were filed with the police regarding the cartoon, and subsequently, an FIR was lodged against the owners, the cartoonist and the editor. The newspaper later published an apology. Police stated that they had increased security at all Lokmat offices across Maharashtra following the attacks.

See also
Lokmat in Hindi
Lokmat in English
Lokmat in Marathi
Alternate Publication in Marathi

References

Asian news websites
1971 establishments in Maharashtra
Daily newspapers published in India
English-language newspapers published in India
Hindi-language newspapers
Marathi-language newspapers
Mass media in Goa
Newspapers established in 1971
Newspapers published in Maharashtra
Newspapers published in Mumbai